Toni Muñoz may refer to:
Toni Muñoz (footballer, born 1968), Spanish football left back
Toni Muñoz (footballer, born 1982), Spanish football forward